Stephen J. Murphy is the Suffolk County register of deeds, serving since 2017. From 1997 until 2016, he served as an at-large member of the Boston City Council.

Boston City Council
Murphy was formerly a member of the Boston City Council. He first joined the Council in February 1997, following the resignation of at-large member Richard P. Iannella, who had been elected Register of Probate of Suffolk County; Murphy had finished fifth in the November 1995 race for four at-large seats, and served the remainder of Iannella's term. Murphy was then elected to a two-year at-large term in November 1997, and subsequently reelected eight times. He served as President of the Council for three years (2011–2013). He lost his seat in the November 2015 election.

From 2011 through 2013, he served as president of the Boston City Council, with Salvatore LaMattina serving as the vice president.

References

Further reading

External links
Suffolk Registry of Deeds
Murphy bio at Suffolk Registry of Deeds
Murphy election history at ourcampaigns.com

                                                                                         

Boston City Council members
Register of deeds in Suffolk County, Massachusetts
Place of birth missing (living people)
Year of birth missing (living people)
Living people